Shrewsbury Historic District may refer to:

Shrewsbury Historic District (Shrewsbury, Massachusetts), listed on the National Register of Historic Places in Worcester County, Massachusetts
Shrewsbury Historic District (Shrewsbury, New Jersey), listed on the National Register of Historic Places in Monmouth County, New Jersey
Shrewsbury Historic District (Shrewsbury, Pennsylvania), listed on the National Register of Historic Places in York County, Pennsylvania